The Battle of Lüneburg Heath (also called the Battle of Ebstorf) was a conflict between the army of King Louis the Younger and the Norse Great Heathen Army fought on 2 February 880 AD, at Lüneburg Heath in today's Lower Saxony.

 Following defeat by Alfred the Great at the Battle of Edington, the Norse Great Heathen Army moved from England to pillage the Duchy of Saxony. The army of Louis met the Norsemen at Lüneburg Heath. The Saxons were routed in a snowstorm, with the army being destroyed or captured.

Known combatants include Marquard of Hildesheim, Theodoric of Minden, Lothar I, Count of Stade, an unidentified count named "Bardonum" and Bruno, Duke of East Saxony who, according to the chronicles Annales Fuldenses and the Gesta Francorum, drowned in a river during the Saxon retreat. Those killed were recognized by the Catholic Church as the Martyrs of Ebsdorf, whose feast day is 2 February.

The Norse army was subsequently defeated at the Battle of Thimeon later that month and finally checked at the Battle of Saucourt.

References

Battles involving France
Battles involving the Vikings
880s conflicts
Battles in Lower Saxony
880
9th century in East Francia